Robbie Thompson (born 22 October 1967) is a former professional Australian rules footballer who played for the Adelaide Football Club in the Australian Football League (AFL)

Thompson was recruited from Glenelg for Adelaide's inaugural AFL season in 1991.

He played in the first three games that the club played in the AFL and performed admirably on debut with 20 disposals against Hawthorn.

A half back flanker, he also played in rounds six and 20 before being delisted in the mid season draft in 1992.

References

External links
 
 

1967 births
Australian rules footballers from South Australia
Adelaide Football Club players
Glenelg Football Club players
Living people